Agama gracilimembris or the Benin agama is a species of lizard native to Africa. It is found in the Afrotropical realm in the savanna as well as forests.

Description 
Agama gracilimembris is considered a dwarf agama; females are longer than males. Both females and males vary in color, however during the breeding season, the colors will become more dichromic. During this period, males will develop a dorsal pattern. The species is usually brown or black.

Distribution 
Agama gracilimembris has a large distribution. It has been either confirmed or sighted in Chad, Central African Republic, Nigeria, Ethiopia, Uganda, Sudan, Democratic Republic of the Congo, Guinea, Ivory Coast, Cameroon, Senegal, Ghana, Togo, Benin, Mali, Niger, and Burkina Faso.

References 

Reptiles described in 1918
Agamid lizards of Africa
Agama (genus)
Fauna of Benin
Fauna of Burkina Faso
Reptiles of Cameroon
Reptiles of the Central African Republic
Fauna of Chad
Reptiles of the Democratic Republic of the Congo
Reptiles of Ethiopia
Fauna of Guinea
Fauna of Ivory Coast
Fauna of Mali
Reptiles of West Africa
Reptiles of Nigeria
Fauna of Senegal
Vertebrates of Sudan
Fauna of Togo
Reptiles of Uganda
Taxa named by Paul Chabanaud